The Battle for Vast Dominion is the third book of the Trophy Chase Trilogy, written by American author George Bryan Polivka, and published by Harvest House Publishers in 2008.

Setting
The story takes place in the fictional country of Nearing Vast, in a time of sailing ships, pirates, sea monsters, and swordsmen. The key characters are a young swordsman, Packer Throme, and his love, Panna Throme, whose story is told throughout the trilogy.

Plot summary
The war between rival kingdoms of Drammun and Nearing Vast reaches its conclusion, with Packer Throme leading his forces to war while convinced that victory can come only from above. The evil Hezzan of Drammune and equally dark forces within Nearing Vast draw Packer into an epic final battle at the legendary feeding grounds of the Firefish, within the uncharted Achawuk Territory. In life.

Spiritual components
Packer was originally called to the priesthood, but failed in seminary. Panna is the daughter of the local priest, who is bitterly disappointed in Packer. Packer's conscience is tried as he attempts to reconcile his original calling, and the teachings of Jesus to “turn the other cheek,” with his swordsmanship. He wants to bring prosperity to Nearing Vast, but do the means justify the end? The storylines also feature the power of prayer, and the motivations of faith.

Trophy Chase Trilogy
 The Legend of the Firefish
 The Hand that Bears the Sword
 The Battle for Vast Dominion

Prequel
Blaggard's Moon

References

American fantasy novels